The Oxford Tracked Carrier ("Carrier, Tracked, CT20") was an early post-World War II British armoured personnel carrier (APC) and artillery tractor.

Use 

The Oxford was substantially larger - weighing in at 6 tons - than the 3-ton Universal Carrier it was designed to replace. It saw service in the Korean War, both as a tractor for the 17 pdr anti-tank gun and as an APC. Several versions of the carrier (CT21-35R, CT23-26) are listed in Chamberlain and Ellis (1973).

Survivors

An Oxford Carrier is held in the collection of The Tank Museum. The carrier in question was used to trial hydraulic steering and the system is still fitted to it.

A surviving Oxford Carrier is on display next to other wrecked US, British and other UN combat vehicles in North Korea's Victorious Fatherland Liberation War Museum in its capital of Pyongyang.

References

External links

Artillery tractors
Cold War armoured fighting vehicles of the United Kingdom
Armoured personnel carriers of the United Kingdom
Armoured personnel carriers of the Cold War
Tracked armoured personnel carriers